2022 was the 60th edition of the Norwegian music competition  (MGP). The contest is held annually and serves as the country's preselection for the Eurovision Song Contest. MGP was organized by Norway's public broadcaster NRK and was held in January and February 2022. The winner of the competition, Subwoolfer with "Give That Wolf a Banana", went on to represent  in the Eurovision Song Contest 2022 in Turin, Italy in May 2022.

Format 
The contest consisted of four semi-finals, a two-part "wild card" round ("Last chance") and a final, held at the H3 Arena in Fornebu across January and February 2022. The concept is similar to the competition in 2021: one contestant qualified for the final from each of the previous rounds, while another five added up to these as pre-qualified entrants, for a total of ten finalists. In the final, two rounds of voting took place, narrowing down the competition to two contestants, and ultimately determining the winner.

In October 2021, in charge of the organization of the event for NRK, announced the broadcaster was considering a few changes to the format, particularly to the voting system, which among other things might have returned to include an international jury vote for the final. This was ultimately ruled out.

The semi-finals and the wild card round took place without an audience due to the COVID-19 pandemic in Norway, particularly due to the spread of the Omicron variant. The final was attended by an audience of 500 spectators.

Competing entries 
About one week after the Eurovision Song Contest 2021, NRK officially opened for songwriters to submit entries for  2022. The submission window was set to close on 15 August 2021, but was later extended to 15 September 2021.

The competition was open to all songwriters, and each songwriter could submit up to three songs. Each song should have had at least one Norwegian contributor, in order to "prioritize and promote the Norwegian music scene". In addition to the open submission, NRK also looked for possible entries through targeted search and direct dialogue with the Norwegian music industry.

In late November 2021, it was reported that 21 entries had been selected to take part in the contest. Originally, the lineup of participating artists was scheduled to be revealed on 6 January 2022, and their entries at a later time; however, it was later decided they would be announced together on 10 January.

Semi-finals

Semi-final 1 
The first semi-final took place on 15 January 2022.

Semi-final 2 
The second semi-final took place on 22 January 2022.

Semi-final 3 
The third semi-final took place on 29 January 2022. Subwoolfer was originally slated to perform in this semi-final as a pre-qualified entrant, before testing positive for COVID-19. Instead, NorthKid, another pre-qualified entrant, performed in this semi-final.

Semi-final 4 
The fourth semi-final took place on 5 February 2022.

Last chance 
The Last chance round took place on two nights on 7 and 12 February 2022. On 7 February, NRK hosted a live broadcast where the public was able to vote on the 12 eliminated acts and assign four wildcards for the second chance semi-final on 12 February, where Maria Mohn with "Fly" ultimately went on to the final.

Final 
The final took place on 19 February 2022.

Ratings

See also 
 Norway in the Eurovision Song Contest
 Eurovision Song Contest 2022

References

External links 

 Melodi Grand Prix on NRK TV 

2022
2022 song contests
Eurovision Song Contest 2022
January 2022 events in Norway
February 2022 events in Norway
2022 in Norwegian music